Zakham is a 2022 Pakistani dramas drama television series first aired on Geo Entertainment, produced by Abdullah Kadwani and Asad Qureshi under their production banner 7th Sky Entertainment and directed by Syed Ramish Rizvi. It features Sehar Khan, Agha Ali, Azfar Rehman and Sidra Niazi in pivotal roles.

Cast
Agha Ali as Sikandar; wealthy and influential businessman.
Sehar Khan as Areej; Affan's love interest.
Azfar Rehman as Affan; Sikandar's younger brother.
Sana Fakhar as Seema; Waqar and Areej's step-mother, she was forced into marriage with Arif.
Sidra Niazi as Aiman; Wajahat's niece, Sikandar's ex-wife and his accomplice in his plan against Areej and Affan.
Kamran Jeelani as Waqar; Areej's elder brother.
Rubina Ashraf as Sualeha; Sikandar and Affan's mother.
Salma Hassan as Rafiya; Waqar's wife.
Waseem Abbas as Arif; Areej, Waqar and Sahiba's father.
Rimha Ahmed as Sahiba; Areej and Waqar's step-sister.
Rehma Khalid as Nazish; Areej's friend and Affan's employee.
Nida Mumtaz as Shahida; Seema's elder sister. Seema took shelter at her home when Sikandar threatens her and Sahiba.
Nayyer Ejaz as Saadiq; Shahida's husband.
Hanif Muhammad as Haider; influential politician and Sikandar's ally.
Ikram Abbasi as Amjad; Sikandar's employee and right hand man.
Syed Saim Ali as Ziyad; Sahiba's love interest.
Laila Azhar as Aaliya: Ziyad's mother.

Guest Appearance
Shaheen Khan as Naheed; Waqar and Areej's mother.
Shabbir Jan as Wajahat; Sikandar and Affan's father.
Birjees Farooqi as Nazish's mother.
Akhtar Ghazali as Areej's employer.
Syed Hamza as Yasir; Sikandar's friend.
Anees Alam as Anees; Sikandar's servant.
Mehboob Sultan as an Income tax officer.

Child stars
Aayat Arif as Areej (kid)
Mariam Khan as Aiman (kid)

Broadcast
Zakham premiered on Saturday June 11, 2022 on Geo Entertainment, airing episodes daily at  9:00 PM, except that on Sunday's, channel aired mega episodes (two episodes together) from 8:00 PM to 10:00 PM.

References

External links

Geo TV original programming
2022 Pakistani television series debuts
2022 Pakistani television series endings